The Kingdom of Kush (Egyptian: 𓎡𓄿𓈙𓈉 kꜣš, Assyrian:  Kûsi, in LXX ;  Ecōš;  Kūš), also known as the Kushite Empire, was an ancient kingdom in Nubia, centered along the Nile Valley in what is now northern Sudan and southern Egypt.

The region of Nubia was an early cradle of civilization, producing several complex societies that engaged in trade and industry. The city-state of Kerma emerged as the dominant political force between 2450 and 1450 BC, controlling the Nile Valley between the first and fourth cataracts, an area as large as Egypt. The Egyptians were the first to identify Kerma as "Kush" and over the next several centuries the two civilizations engaged in intermittent warfare, trade, and cultural exchange.

Much of Nubia came under Egyptian rule during the New Kingdom period (1550–1070 BC). Following Egypt's disintegration amid the Late Bronze Age collapse, the Kushites reestablished a kingdom in Napata (now modern Karima, Sudan). Though Kush had developed many cultural affinities with Egypt, such as the veneration of Amun, and the royal families of both kingdoms often intermarried, Kushite culture was distinct; Egyptian art distinguished the people of Kush by their dress, appearance, and even method of transportation.

In the 8th century BC, King Kashta ("the Kushite") peacefully became King of Upper Egypt, while his daughter, Amenirdis, was appointed as Divine Adoratrice of Amun in Thebes. His successor Piye invaded Lower Egypt, establishing the Kushite-ruled Twenty-fifth Dynasty. Piye's daughter, Shepenupet II, was also appointed Divine Adoratrice of Amun. The monarchs of Kush ruled Egypt for over a century until the Assyrian conquest, finally being expelled by the Egyptian Psamtik I in the mid-seventh century BC. Following the severing of ties with Egypt, the Kushite imperial capital was located at Meroë, during which time it was known by the Greeks as Aethiopia.

From the third century BC to the third century AD, northern Nubia would be invaded and annexed by Egypt. Ruled by the Macedonians and Romans for the next 600 years, this territory would be known in the Greco-Roman world as Dodekaschoinos. It was later taken back under control by the fourth Kushite king Yesebokheamani. The Kingdom of Kush persisted as a major regional power until the fourth century AD when it weakened and disintegrated from internal rebellion amid worsening climatic conditions, and invasions and conquest by the Noba people. The city of Meroë was captured and pillaged by the Kingdom of Aksum, marking the end of the kingdom and its dissolution into the three polities of Nobatia, Makuria and Alodia. Sometime after this event, the kingdom of Alodia would gain control of the southern territory of the former Meroitic empire including parts of Eritrea.

Long overshadowed by its more prominent Egyptian neighbor, archaeological discoveries since the late 20th century have revealed Kush to be an advanced civilization in its own right. The Kushites had their own unique language and script; maintained a complex economy based on trade and industry; mastered archery; and developed a complex, urban society with uniquely high levels of female participation.

Name 

It is also an ethnic term for the native population who initiated the kingdom of Kush. The term is also displayed in the names of Kushite persons, such as King Kashta (a transcription of kꜣš-tꜣ "(one from) the land of Kush"). Geographically, Kush referred to the region south of the first cataract in general. Kush also was the home of the rulers of the 25th Dynasty.

The name Kush, since at least the time of Josephus, has been connected with the biblical character Cush, in the Hebrew Bible, son of Ham (Genesis 10:6). Ham had four sons named: Cush, Put, Canaan, and Mizraim (Hebrew name for Egypt). According to the Bible, Nimrod, a son of Cush, was the founder and king of Babylon, Erech, Akkad and Calneh, in Shinar (Gen 10:10). The Bible also makes reference to someone named Cush who is a Benjamite (Psalms 7:1, KJV).

In Greek sources Kush was known as Kous (Κους) or Aethiopia (Αἰθιοπία).

History

Origins

Kerma culture (2500–1500 BC) 

The Kerma culture was an early civilization centered in Kerma, Sudan. It flourished from around 2500 BC to 1500 BC in ancient Nubia. The Kerma culture was based in the southern part of Nubia, or "Upper Nubia" (in parts of present-day northern and central Sudan), and later extended its reach northward into Lower Nubia and the border of Egypt. The polity seems to have been one of several Nile Valley states during the Middle Kingdom of Egypt. In the Kingdom of Kerma's latest phase, lasting from about 1700–1500 BC, it absorbed the Sudanese kingdom of Sai and became a sizable, populous empire rivaling Egypt.

Egyptian Nubia (1504–1070 BC) 
Mentuhotep II, the 21st century BC founder of the Middle Kingdom, is recorded to have undertaken campaigns against Kush in the 29th and 31st years of his reign. This is the earliest Egyptian reference to Kush; the Nubian region had gone by other names in the Old Kingdom. Under Thutmose I, Egypt made several campaigns south.

The Egyptians ruled Kush in the New kingdom beginning when the Egyptian King Thutmose I occupied Kush and destroyed its capital, Kerma.

This eventually resulted in their annexation of Nubia . Around 1500 BC, Nubia was absorbed into the New Kingdom of Egypt, but rebellions continued for centuries. After the conquest, Kerma culture was increasingly Egyptianized, yet rebellions continued for 220 years until . Nubia nevertheless became a key province of the New Kingdom, economically, politically, and spiritually. Indeed, major pharaonic ceremonies were held at Jebel Barkal near Napata. As an Egyptian colony from the 16th century BC, Nubia ("Kush") was governed by an Egyptian Viceroy of Kush.

Resistance to the early eighteenth Dynasty Egyptian rule by neighboring Kush is evidenced in the writings of Ahmose, son of Ebana, an Egyptian warrior who served under Nebpehtrya Ahmose (1539–1514 BC), Djeserkara Amenhotep I (1514–1493 BC), and Aakheperkara Thutmose I (1493–1481 BC). At the end of the Second Intermediate Period (mid-sixteenth century BC), Egypt faced the twin existential threats—the Hyksos in the North and the Kushites in the South. Taken from the autobiographical inscriptions on the walls of his tomb-chapel, the Egyptians undertook campaigns to defeat Kush and conquer Nubia under the rule of Amenhotep I (1514–1493 BC). In Ahmose's writings, the Kushites are described as archers, "Now after his Majesty had slain the Bedoin of Asia, he sailed upstream to Upper Nubia to destroy the Nubian bowmen." The tomb writings contain two other references to the Nubian bowmen of Kush. By 1200 BC, Egyptian involvement in the Dongola Reach was nonexistent.

Egypt's international prestige had declined considerably towards the end of the Third Intermediate Period. Its historical allies, the inhabitants of Canaan, had fallen to the Middle Assyrian Empire (1365–1020 BC), and then the resurgent Neo-Assyrian Empire (935–605 BC). The Assyrians, from the tenth century BC onwards, had once more expanded from northern Mesopotamia, and conquered a vast empire, including the whole of the Near East, and much of Anatolia, the eastern Mediterranean, the Caucasus and early Iron Age Iran.

Kingdom of Kush (1070 BC) 

With the disintegration of the New Kingdom around 1070 BC, Kush became an independent kingdom centered at Napata in modern northern Sudan. This more-Egyptianized "Kingdom of Kush" emerged, possibly from Kerma, and regained the region's independence from Egypt. The extent of cultural/political continuity between the Kerma culture and the chronologically succeeding Kingdom of Kush is difficult to determine. The latter polity began to emerge around 1000 BC, 500 years after the end of the Kingdom of Kerma.

The Kush rulers were regarded as guardians of the state religion and were responsible for maintaining the houses of the gods. Some scholars believe the economy in the Kingdom of Kush was a redistributive system. The state would collect taxes in the form of surplus produce and would redistribute to the people. Others believe that most of the society worked on the land and required nothing from the state and did not contribute to the state. Northern Kush seems to have been more productive and wealthier than the Southern area.

Dental trait analysis of fossils dating from the Meroitic period in Semna, in northern Nubia near Egypt, found that they displayed traits similar to those of populations inhabiting the Nile, Horn of Africa, and Maghreb. Traits from mesolithic and southern Nubia around Meroe however indicated a closer affinity with other sub-Saharan dental records. It is indicative of a north–south gradient along the Nile river.

Napatan period (750–542 BC)

Nubian conquest of Egypt (25th Dynasty) 

By the eighth century BC, the new Kushite kingdom emerged from the Napata region of the upper Dongola Reach. The first Napatan king, Alara founded the Napatan, or 25th, Kushite dynasty at Napata in Nubia, now Sudan. Alara dedicated his sister to the cult of Amun at the rebuilt Kawa temple, while temples were also rebuilt at Barkal and Kerma. A Kashta stele at Elephantine, places the Kushites on the Egyptian frontier by the mid-eighteenth century. This first period of the kingdom's history, the 'Napatan', was succeeded by the 'Meroitic', when the royal cemeteries relocated to Meroë around 300 BC.

Alara's successor Kashta extended Kushite control north to Elephantine and Thebes in Upper Egypt. Kashta's successor Piye seized control of Lower Egypt around 727 BC. Piye's 'Victory Stela', celebrating these campaigns between 728 and 716 BC, was found in the Amun temple at Jebel Barkal. He invaded an Egypt fragmented into four kingdoms, ruled by King Peftjauawybast, King Nimlot, King Iuput II, and King Osorkon IV.

Why the Kushites chose to enter Egypt at this crucial point of foreign domination is subject to debate. Archaeologist Timothy Kendall offers his own hypotheses, connecting it to a claim of legitimacy associated with Jebel Barkal. Kendall cites the Victory Stele of Piye at Jebel Barkal, which states that "Amun of Napata granted me to be ruler of every foreign country," and "Amun in Thebes granted me to be ruler of the Black Land (Kmt)". According to Kendall, "foreign lands" in this regard seems to include Lower Egypt while "Kmt" seems to refer to a united Upper Egypt and Nubia.

Piye's successor, Shabataka, defeated the Saite kings of northern Egypt between 711 and 710 BC and installed himself as king in Memphis. He then established ties with Sargon II. Piye's son, Taharqa's army undertook successful military campaigns, as attested by the "list of conquered Asiatic principalities" from the Mut temple at Karnak and "conquered peoples and countries (Libyans, Shasu nomads, Phoenicians?, Khor in Palestine)" from Sanam temple inscriptions. Imperial ambitions of the Mesopotamian based Assyrian Empire made war with the 25th dynasty inevitable. In 701 BC, Taharqa and his army aided Judah and King Hezekiah in withstanding a siege by King Sennacherib of the Assyrians (2 Kings 19:9; Isaiah 37:9). There are various theories (Taharqa's army, disease, divine intervention, Hezekiah's surrender) as to why the Assyrians failed to take the city and withdrew to Assyria. Historian László Török mentions that Egypt's army "was beaten at Eltekeh" under Taharqa's command, but "the battle could be interpreted as a victory for the double kingdom", since Assyria did not take Jerusalem and "retreated to Assyria.

The power of the 25th Dynasty reached a climax under Taharqa. The Nile valley empire was as large as it had been since the New Kingdom. New prosperity revived Egyptian culture. Religion, the arts, and architecture were restored to their glorious Old, Middle, and New Kingdom forms. The Nubian pharaohs built or restored temples and monuments throughout the Nile valley, including Memphis, Karnak, Kawa, and Jebel Barkal. It was during the 25th dynasty that the Nile valley saw the first widespread construction of pyramids (many in modern Sudan) since the Middle Kingdom. The Kushites developed their own script, the Meroitic alphabet, which was influenced by Egyptian writing systems , although it appears to have been wholly confined to the royal court and major temples.

Assyrian conquest of Egypt 

Taharqa initially defeated the Assyrians when war broke out in 674 BC. Yet, in 671 BC, the Assyrian King Esarhaddon started the Assyrian conquest of Egypt, took Memphis, and Taharqo retreated to the south, while his heir and other family members were taken to Assyria as prisoners. However, the native Egyptian vassal rulers installed by Esarhaddon as puppets were unable to effectively retain full control, and Taharqa was able to regain control of Memphis. Esarhaddon's 669 BC campaign to once more eject Taharqa was abandoned when Esarhaddon died in Palestine on the way to Egypt. Yet, Esarhaddon's successor, Ashurbanipal, did defeat Taharqa, and Taharqa died soon after in 664 BC.

Taharqa's successor, Tantamani sailed north from Napata, through Elephantine, and to Thebes with a large army to Thebes, where he was "ritually installed as the king of Egypt." From Thebes, Tantamani began his reconquest and regained control of Egypt, as far north as Memphis. Tantamani's dream stele states that he restored order from the chaos, where royal temples and cults were not being maintained. After defeating Sais and killing Assyria's vassal, Necho I, in Memphis, "some local dynasts formally surrendered, while others withdrew to their fortresses. Tantamani proceeded north of Memphis, invading Lower Egypt and, besieged cities in the Delta, a number of which surrendered to him. The Assyrians, who had a military presence in the Levant, then sent a large army southwards in 663 BC. Tantamani was routed, and the Assyrian army sacked Thebes to such an extent it never truly recovered. Tantamani was chased back to Nubia, but his control over Upper Egypt endured until c. 656 BC. At this date, a native Egyptian ruler, Psamtik I son of Necho, placed on the throne as a vassal of Ashurbanipal, took control of Thebes. The last links between Kush and Upper Egypt were severed after hostilities with the Saite kings in the 590s BC.

The Kushites used the animal-driven water wheel to increase productivity and create a surplus, particularly during the Napatan-Meroitic Kingdom.

Achaemenid period 

Herodotus mentioned an invasion of Kush by the Achaemenid ruler Cambyses. By some accounts Cambyses succeeded in occupying the area between the first and second Nile cataract, however Herodotus mentions that "his expedition failed miserably in the desert." Achaemenid inscriptions from both Egypt and Iran include Kush as part of the Achaemenid empire. For example, the DNa inscription of Darius I on his tomb at Naqsh-e Rustam mentions Kūšīyā (Old Persian cuneiform: 𐎤𐎢𐏁𐎡𐎹𐎠, pronounced Kūshīyā) among the territories being "ruled over" by the Achaemenid Empire. Derek Welsby states "scholars have doubted that this Persian expedition ever took place, but... archaeological evidence suggests that the fortress of Dorginarti near the second cataract served as Persia's southern boundary."

Meroitic period (542 BC–4th century AD) 

Kushite civilization continued for several centuries. According to Welsby, "throughout the Saite, Persian, Ptolemaic, and Roman periods, the Kushite rulers—the descendants of the XXVth Dynasty pharaohs, and the guardians of the Temple of Amun at Jebel Barkal—could have pressed their 'legitimate' claim for control of Egypt and they thus posed a potential threat to the rulers of Egypt." Aspelta moved the capital to Meroë, considerably farther south than Napata, possibly c. 591 BC, just after the sack of Napata by Psamtik II. Martin Meredith states the Kushite rulers chose Meroë, between the Fifth and Sixth Cataracts, because it was on the fringe of the summer rainfall belt, and the area was rich in iron ore and hardwood for iron working. The location also afforded access to trade routes to the Red Sea. The Kush traded iron products with the Romans, in addition to gold, ivory and slaves. Yet, the Butana plain was stripped of its forests, leaving behind slag piles.

In about 300 BC the move to Meroë was made more complete when the monarchs began to be buried there, instead of at Napata. One theory is that this represents the monarchs breaking away from the power of the priests at Napata. According to Diodorus Siculus, a Kushite king, "Ergamenes", defied the priests and had them slaughtered. This story may refer to the first ruler to be buried at Meroë with a similar name such as Arqamani, who ruled many years after the royal cemetery was opened at Meroë. During this same period, the Kushite authority may have extended some 1,500 km along the Nile River valley from the Egyptian frontier in the north to areas far south of modern Khartoum and probably also substantial territories to the east and west.

Ptolemaic period 
There is no record of conflict between the Kushites and Ptolemies. However, there was a serious revolt at the end of Ptolemy IV, around 204 BC, and the Kushites likely tried to interfere in Ptolemaic affairs. It has been suggested that this led to Ptolemy V defacing the name of Arqamani on inscriptions at Philae. "Arqamani constructed a small entrance hall to the temple built by Ptolemy IV at selchis and constructed a temple at Philae to which Ptolemy contributed an entrance hall." There is evidence of Ptolemaic occupation as far south as the second cataract, but recent finds at Qasr Ibrim, such as "the total absence of Ptolemaic pottery" have cast doubts on the effectiveness of the occupation. Dynastic struggles led to the Ptolemies abandoning the area, so "the Kushites reasserted their control...with Qasr Ibrim occupied" (by the Kushites) and other locations perhaps garrisoned.

Roman period 
According to Welsby, after the Romans assumed control of Egypt, they negotiated with the Kushites at Philae and drew the southern border of Roman Egypt at Aswan. Theodor Mommsen and Welsby state the Kingdom of Kush became a client Kingdom, which was similar to the situation under Ptolemaic rule of Egypt. Kushite ambition and excessive Roman taxation are two theories for a revolt that was supported by Kushite armies. The ancient historians, Strabo and Pliny, give accounts of the conflict with Roman Egypt.

Strabo describes a war with the Romans in the first century BC. According to Strabo, the Kushites "sacked Aswan with an army of 30,000 men and destroyed imperial statues...at Philae." A "fine over-life-size bronze head of the emperor Augustus" was found buried in Meroe in front of a temple. After the initial victories of Kandake (or "Candace") Amanirenas against Roman Egypt, the Kushites were defeated and Napata sacked. Remarkably, the destruction of the capital of Napata was not a crippling blow to the Kushites and did not frighten Candace enough to prevent her from again engaging in combat with the Roman military. In 22 BC, a large Kushite force moved northward with intention of attacking Qasr Ibrim.
Alerted to the advance, Gaius Petronius, prefect of Roman Egypt, again marched south and managed to reach Qasr Ibrim and bolster its defenses before the invading Kushites arrived. Welsby states after a Kushite attack on Primis (Qasr Ibrim), the Kushites sent ambassadors to negotiate a peace settlement with Petronius. The Kushites succeeded in negotiating a peace treaty on favorable terms. Trade between the two nations increased and the Roman Egyptian border being extended to "Hiera Sykaminos (Maharraqa)." This arrangement "guaranteed peace for most of the next 300 years" and there is "no definite evidence of further clashes."

It is possible that the Roman emperor Nero planned another attempt to conquer Kush before his death in AD 68. Nero sent two centurions upriver as far as Bahr el Ghazal River in 66 AD in an attempt to discover the source of the Nile, per Seneca, or plan an attack, per Pliny. Kush began to fade as a power by the first or second century AD, sapped by the war with the Roman province of Egypt and the decline of its traditional industries. However, there is evidence of third century AD Kushite Kings at Philae in demotic and inscription. It has been suggested that the Kushites reoccupied lower Nubia after Roman forces were withdrawn to Aswan. Kushite activities led others to note "a de facto Kushite control of that area (as far north as Philae) for part of the third century AD. Thereafter, it weakened and disintegrated due to internal rebellion. In the mid-4th century, Kush attacked Axum, perhaps in a dispute over the region's ivory trade. Axum responded with a large force, sacking Meroe and leading the civilization to go in decline. Christianity began to gain over the old pharaonic religion and by the mid-sixth century AD the Kingdom of Kush was dissolved.

Language and writing 

The Meroitic language was spoken in Meroë and Sudan during the Meroitic period (attested from 300 BC). It became extinct about 400 AD. It is uncertain to which language family the Meroitic language is related. Kirsty Rowan suggests that Meroitic, like the Egyptian language, belongs to the Afro-Asiatic family. She bases this on its sound inventory and phonotactics, which she argues are similar to those of the Afro-Asiatic languages and dissimilar from those of the Nilo-Saharan languages.
Claude Rilly proposes that Meroitic, like the Nobiin language, belongs to the Eastern Sudanic branch of the Nilo-Saharan family, based in part on its syntax, morphology, and known vocabulary.

In the Napatan Period Egyptian hieroglyphs were used: at this time writing seems to have been restricted to the court and temples. From the second century BC, there was a separate Meroitic writing system. The language was written in two forms of the Meroitic alphabet: Meroitic Cursive, which was written with a stylus and was used for general record-keeping; and Meroitic Hieroglyphic, which was carved in stone or used for royal or religious documents. It is not well understood due to the scarcity of bilingual texts. The earliest inscription in Meroitic writing dates from between 180 and 170 BC. These hieroglyphics were found engraved on the temple of Queen Shanakdakhete. Meroitic Cursive is written horizontally, and reads from right to left. This was an alphabetic script with 23 signs used in a hieroglyphic form (mainly on monumental art) and in a cursive form. The latter was widely used; so far some 1,278 texts using this version are known (Leclant 2000). The script was deciphered by Griffith, but the language behind it is still a problem, with only a few words understood by modern scholars. It is not as yet possible to connect the Meroitic language with other known languages. For a time, it was also possibly used to write the Old Nubian language of the successor Nubian kingdoms.

Technology, medicine, and mathematics

Technology 
The natives of the Kingdom of Kush developed a type of water wheel or scoop wheel, the saqiyah, named kolē by the Kush. The saqiyah was developed during the Meroitic period to improve irrigation. The introduction of this machine had a decisive influence on agriculture especially in Dongola as this wheel lifted water 3 to 8 meters with much less expenditure of labor and time than the shaduf, which was the previous chief irrigation device in the kingdom. The shaduf relied on human energy but the saqiyah was driven by buffalos or other animals. The people of Kerma, ancestors to the Kushites, built bronze kilns through which they manufactured objects of daily use such as razors, mirrors and tweezers.

The Kushites developed a form of reservoir, known as a hafir, during the Meroitic period. Eight hundred ancient and modern hafirs have been registered in the Meroitic town of Butana.
The functions of hafirs were to catch water during the rainy season for storage, to ensure water is available for several months during the dry season as well as supply drinking water, irrigate fields, and water cattle. The Great Hafir, or Great Reservoir, near the Lion Temple in Musawwarat es-Sufra is a notable hafir built by the Kushites. It was built to retain the rainfall of the short, wet season. It is 250 m in diameter and 6.3 m deep.

Bloomeries and blast furnaces could have been used in metalworking at Meroë. Early records of bloomery furnaces dated at least to seventh and sixth century BC have been discovered in Kush. It is known that the ancient bloomeries that produced metal tools for the Kushites produced a surplus for sale.

Medicine 
Nubian mummies studied in the 1990s revealed that Kush was a pioneer of early antibiotics.

Tetracycline was being used by Nubians, based on bone remains between 350 AD and 550 AD. The antibiotic was in wide commercial use only in the mid 20th century. The theory states that earthen jars containing grain used for making beer contained the bacterium streptomyces, which produced tetracycline. Although Nubians were not aware of tetracycline, they could have noticed that people fared better by drinking beer. According to Charlie Bamforth, a professor of biochemistry and brewing science at the University of California, Davis, he said "They must have consumed it because it was rather tastier than the grain from which it was derived. They would have noticed people fared better by consuming this product than they were just consuming the grain itself."

Mathematics 
Based on engraved plans of Meroitic King Amanikhabali's pyramids, Nubians had a sophisticated understanding of mathematics as they appreciated the harmonic ratio. The engraved plans is indicative of much to be revealed about Nubian mathematics. The ancient Nubians also established a system of geometry which they used in creating early versions of sun clocks. During the Meroitic period in Nubian history, the Nubians used a trigonometric methodology similar to the Egyptians.

Military 

During the siege of Hermopolis in the eighth century BC, siege towers were built for the Kushite army led by Piye, in order to enhance the efficiency of Kushite archers and slingers.
After leaving Thebes, Piye's first objective was besieging Ashmunein. He gathered his army after their lack of success so far, and undertook the personal supervision of operations including the erection of a siege tower from which Kushite archers could fire down into the city.
Early shelters protecting sappers armed with poles trying to breach mud-brick ramparts gave way to battering rams.

Bowmen were the most important force components in the Kushite military. Ancient sources indicate that Kushite archers favored one-piece bows that were between six and seven feet long, with so powerful a draw strength that many of the archers used their feet to bend their bows. However, composite bows were also used in their arsenal. Greek historian Herodotus indicated that primary bow construction was of seasoned palm wood, with arrows made of cane. Kushite arrows were often poisoned-tipped.

Elephants were occasionally used in warfare during the Meroitic period, as seen in the war against Rome around 20 BC.

Architecture 

During the Bronze Age, Nubian ancestors of the Kingdom of Kush built speoi (a speos is a temple or tomb cut into a rock face) between 3700 and 3250 BC. This greatly influenced the architecture of the New Kingdom of Egypt.
Tomb monuments were one of the more recognizable expressions of Kushite architecture. Uniquely Kushite tomb monuments were found from the beginning of the empire, at el Kurru, to the decline of the kingdom. These monuments developed organically from Middle Nile (e.g. A-group) burial types. Tombs became progressively larger during the 25th dynasty, culminating in Taharqa's underground rectangular building with "aisles of square piers...the whole being cut from the living rock." Kushites also created pyramids, mud-brick temples (deffufa), and masonry temples. Kushites borrowed much from Egypt, as it relates to temple design. Kushite temples were quite diverse in their plans, except for the Amun temples which all have the same basic plan. The Jebel Barkal and Meroe Amun temples are exceptions with the 150 m long Jebel Barkal being "by far the largest 'Egyptian' temple ever built in Nubia." Temples for major Egyptian deities were built on "a system of internal harmonic proportions" based on "one or more rectangles each with sides in the ratio of 8:5" Kush also invented Nubian vaults.

Piye is thought to have constructed the first true pyramid at el Kurru. Pyramids are "the archetypal tomb monument of the Kushite royal family" and found at "el Kurru, Nuri, Jebel Barkal, and Meroe." The Kushite pyramids are smaller with steeper sides than northern Egyptian pyramids. The Kushites are thought to have copied the pyramids of New Kingdom elites, as opposed to Old and Middle Kingdom pharaohs. Kushite housing consisted mostly of circular timber huts with some apartment houses with several two-room apartments. The apartment houses likely accommodated extended families.

The Kushites built a stone-paved road at Jebel Barkal, are thought to have built piers/harbors on the Nile river, and many wells.

Kush and Egyptology 
On account of the Kingdom of Kush's proximity to Ancient Egypt – the first cataract at Elephantine usually being considered the traditional border between the two polities – and because the 25th dynasty ruled over both states in the eighth century BC, from the Rift Valley to the Taurus mountains, historians have closely associated the study of Kush with Egyptology, in keeping with the general assumption that the complex sociopolitical development of Egypt's neighbors can be understood in terms of Egyptian models. As a result, the political structure and organization of Kush as an independent ancient state has not received as thorough attention from scholars, and there remains much ambiguity especially surrounding the earliest periods of the state. Edwards has suggested that the study of the region could benefit from increased recognition of Kush as a state in its own right, with distinct cultural conditions, rather than merely as a secondary state on the periphery of Egypt.

Kushite images

See also 
 Aethiopia is an ancient Greek geographical term which referred to the regions of Sudan and areas south of the Sahara desert.
 List of monarchs of Kush
 Merowe Dam
 Nubiology
 Twenty-fifth Dynasty of Egypt family tree

References

Sources

Further reading

External links 

 Dan Morrison, "Ancient Gold Center Discovered on the Nile", National Geographic News
 "Civilizations in Africa: Kush", Washington State University 
"Remembering the Remarkable Queens Who Ruled Ancient Nubia" at Atlas Obscura, December 15, 2021
 African Kingdoms  Kush
 
 Joseph Poplicha, "The Biblical Nimrod and the Kingdom of Eanna", Journal of the American Oriental Society, Vol. 49, (1929), pp. 303–317
 Kerma website Official website of the Swiss archeological mission to Sudan.
 Josefine Kuckertz: Meroe and Egypt. In Wolfram Grajetzki, Solange Ashby, Willeke Wendrich (eds.): UCLA Encyclopedia of Egyptology. Los Angeles 2021,  (online).

 
States and territories established in the 8th century BC
States and territories disestablished in the 4th century
11th-century BC establishments
350s disestablishments
Roman client kingdoms
Former kingdoms
Former empires